Elections in Rajasthan have been held since 1952 to elect members of Rajasthan Legislative Assembly and of Lok Sabha. There are 200 assembly constituencies and 25 Lok sabha constituencies. In 2018, Legislative assembly election in Rajasthan were held on 7 December 2018.

Main political parties
The Indian National Congress (INC) and the Bharatiya Janata Party (BJP) are the two most dominant parties in the state. In the past, various parties such as Janata Party (JP), Janata Dal (JD), Swatantra Party, CPIM, Bharatiya Jana Sangh (BJS) and Ram Rajya Parishad (RRP) have also been influential.

Lok Sabha elections
Till 1980

Total Seats- 25

Vidhan Sabha elections
The elections for the Rajasthan Legislative Assembly (Vidhan Sabha) have been held since 1952.

References